Jumla is the centre of Chandannath Municipality in Jumla District of Karnali Province of Nepal. It is located at 2514 metres (8251 feet) elevation.

Geography
Jumla is one of the 77 districts in the midwestern hills of Nepal. Rice (Oryza sativa L) cultivation in Jumla ranges from 2,400 to 3,050 m altitude, which is the highest elevation in the world. The highest elevation at 3,050 m is Chhumjul of Jumla, a record altitude, where rice is cultivated in Nepal. Jumli Marshi, a Japonica variety of indigenous rice, having cold tolerant gene, is probably cultivated since 1,300 years ago in Jumla in the bank of the Tila river. The Tila Valley as well as the Sinja Khola Valley are covered with paddy fields growing the 'Kali Marshi' rice variety, a unique red rice that is sought after for its special taste.

Jumla has a STOL airport, Jumla Airport, and the road network first reached it from Surkhet in May 2007. It is the usual starting point for treks to Rara Lake.

Climate
Jumla has a highland oceanic climate that is cooled down by its elevation. As a result, the climate retains strong diurnal temperature variation in winter and the moderation is from subtropical influence as opposed to maritime.

References

https://nepalensis.com/districts-in-nepal

Populated places in Jumla District
Towns in Nepal